Byadh (The Hunter) is a Bengali crime thriller streaming television series directed by Abhirup Ghosh and based on Rajarshi Das Bhowmick's story Chorai Hatya Rohoshya. It was released on Hoichoi OTT platform on 11 February 2022 under the banner of Zeoline Media production. It stars Anirban Chakraborty, Rajatava Dutta and Kharaj Mukherjee in pivotal roles.

Plot
The series begins when an unnamed mysterious man is brutally killing sparrows in different villages of West Bengal. Police commissioner sends the case to the Department of unusual cases. This department deals with worthless issues which are considered to be unimportant by the police. Experienced officer Kanaicharan and newcomer Souvik are investigating the cases. Both get deeply involved in the matter and the cat and mouse game begins. It reveals that someone is killing sparrows following the ideology of Four Pests campaign.

Cast
 Rajatava Dutta as Kanaicharan Das
 Anirban Chakraborty as Bishu
 Kharaj Mukherjee as Bhanu Samaddar
 Anashua Majumdar as Tanima Sen, Ornithologist
 Souman Bose as Souvik
 Bibriti Chatterjee as Mrinalini Gomes

Episodes

Season 1 (2021)

References

Bengali-language web series
Indian crime television series
Thriller web series
Hoichoi original programming

External links